Emerald Lakes is a census-designated place located in Tobyhanna and Tunkhannock Townships in Monroe County in the state of Pennsylvania. The community is located near Interstates 80 and 380. As of the 2010 census the population was 2,886 residents.

Demographics

References

Census-designated places in Monroe County, Pennsylvania
Census-designated places in Pennsylvania